Discovery Bluff is a conspicuous headland forming the west side of the entrance to Avalanche Bay in Granite Harbour, Victoria Land. It was discovered by the British National Antarctic Expedition (1901) under Robert Falcon Scott, who referred to the feature as "Rendezvous Bluff". It was renamed for the ship Discovery by Scott's second expedition, the British Antarctic Expedition, 1910–13.

References 

Headlands of Victoria Land
Scott Coast